Bampsia is a genus of flowering plant belonging to the family Linderniaceae.

Its native range is Democratic Republic of the Congo.

Species:

Bampsia lawalreeana 
Bampsia symoensiana

References

Linderniaceae
Lamiales genera